Latvia–Turkey relations are the foreign relations between Latvia and Turkey. Both countries are members of NATO and the Organization for Security and Cooperation in Europe.

History
 Turkey recognized the independence of Latvia in 1925 and diplomatic relations were established on August 28, 1925. 
 Following the USSR annexation of Latvia in August 1940, Turkey closed its consulate in Riga– in tandem with the United States– on September 5, 1940. Despite the closure of the consulate, Turkey never recognized the Latvia's annexation and continued diplomatic relations with Latvia and Estonia by conferring diplomatic status on the diplomats that were accredited by the previous Latvian government. 
 Turkey recognized the restoration of Latvia's independence on September 3, 1991.

High level visits

Economic Relations 

Trade volume between the two countries was 398 million USD in 2016 (Turkish exports/imports: 196/202 million USD).

See also 

 Foreign relations of Latvia
 Foreign relations of Turkey
 EU–Turkey relations

References 

Latvia–Turkey relations
Turkey
Bilateral relations of Turkey